Hélder de Paula Dalmonech or simply Hélder (born March 6, 1986 in Divino de São Lourenço), is a Brazilian central defender. He currently plays for Flamengo.

Made professional debut for Flamengo in a 1-0 away win against Volta Redonda on September 27, 2006 in the Campeonato Carioca.

Honours
Rio de Janeiro State League: 2007

Contract
1 May 2006 to 30 April 2008

External links
 sambafoot
 CBF
 zerozero.pt
 soccerterminal
 Guardian Stats Centre
 globoesporte

1986 births
Living people
Brazilian footballers
CR Flamengo footballers
Association football defenders